Rabigh is a city and governorate in the Province of Makkah of the Kingdom of Saudi Arabia, situated on the coast of the Red Sea, around  northwest of Mecca in the historic Hejazi region. The city dates back to the era before the advent of Islam in the 7th century C.E., and up to the 17th century, was known as Al-Juhfah, or Al-Johfah.

Due to the strategic location of Rabigh on the Red Sea, it has been the site of several high-profile projects such as the King Abdullah University of Science and Technology, Petro Rabigh and King Abdullah Economic City. The Rabigh Governorate is divided into 5 marākiz (centres), Rabigh, Nuweiba, Abwa', Mastoura and al-Qadimah. It is governed by Governor Khalid al-Ghanmi.

History 

The historical importance of the city is driven by the fact that it was a stopover for Hajj and Umrah pilgrims coming from Egypt and the Levant, as defined by the Islamic Prophet Muhammad. The city was also located along pre-Islamic caravan routes between Yemen and the Levant. As a coastal town, fishing was the main source of income for the people of Rabigh, until the discovery of oil.

Rabigh is known to have existed before the advent of Islam. Even up to the 17th century, the area in and around the city was known by its old name, al-Juhfah, also spelt al-Johfah. During the time of Muhammad, Rabigh was a frequent site of raids by Muslims on the Meccan caravans that passed through the region. It has been recorded Sahih Bukhari that Muhammad defined Al-Juhfah as the miqat for pilgrims arriving for Hajj and Umrah from Egypt and the Levant.

Ubaydah's expedition 

According to Islamic historical sources, in April 623 CE, the Prophet Muhammad sent Ubaydah ibn al-Harith with a party of sixty armed Muhajirun to the baṭn of Rabigh. They expected to intercept a Qurayshi caravan that was returning from Ash-Shaam, under the protection of Abu Sufyan ibn Harb and 200 armed riders. The Muslim party travelled as far as the wells at Thanyat al-Murra, where Ubaydah ibn al-Harith shot an arrow at the Quraysh. This is known as the first arrow of Islam. Despite this surprise attack, "they did not unsheath a sword or approach one another," and the Muslims returned empty-handed; however, two Meccan traders left their caravan, became Muslim, and went with the expedition back to Medina.

Ghadir Khumm 

The hadith of the pond of Khumm narrates that Muhammad is reported to have pronounced Ali ibn Abi Talib as the Mawla of those for whom Muhammad was the Mawla. Shi'ite Muslims take and claim this hadith as an announcement and investiture of Ali bin Abi Talib as the first caliph or successor after the Prophet's death and they celebrate this announcement each year as Eid al-Ghadeer. Many Sunnis also accept that the Prophet did actually declare Ali as the Mawla, however they refuse to believe that this meant succession to the Prophet.

During a part of the sermon, he raised Ali's arm and asked the people, "Who has more priority over you than yourself?" They responded, "Allah and his messenger." Muhammad then said:

The event has been documented in Shi'ite and Sunni sources. After the sermon, Abu Bakr, Umar, and Uthman are all said to have given their allegiance to Ali, also documented in the sources of both Islamic denominations.

Modern history 
With the discovery of oil in Saudi Arabia and the completion of the East–West pipeline, Saudi Aramco chose Rabigh to be the site of their new refinery and port. Construction on the Rabigh refinery began in 1981, during the reign of King Fahd. The joint venture between Saudi Aramco and Japan's Sumitomo Chemical, the $10-billion Rabigh Refining and Petrochemical Company, also known as Petro Rabigh, was founded in 2005. It is currently the second-largest integrated oil refinery and petrochemical production facility in Saudi Arabia.

Most other projects in and around Rabigh were built under King Abdullah and are thus named for him, such as the King Abdullah University of Science and Technology, an international, graduate-level research university. Founded in 2009, it is the first co-educational university campus in Saudi Arabia; and the King Abdullah Economic City, facilitated by the Saudi Arabian General Investment Authority, construction of which began in 2005. The project is being developed by Emaar, a Tadawul-listed company first established to develop KAEC. The King Abdullah Port, one Saudi Arabia's largest ports, is situated in the city, and was inaugurated on 11 February 2019.

Transport 
Highway 5, Saudi Arabia's westernmost north-south highway, runs through Rabigh, providing access to Yanbu, Umluj, Duba (a ferry to Egypt is available at the port of Duba), Tabuk, and Jordan; and Jeddah, Mecca, Abha and Jizan in the south. A connection to Highway 60 near Yanbu connects Rabigh to Medina. Riyadh and the Qassim Province. Highway 40 is accessible through Jeddah, providing connections to Mecca, Riyadh and Dammam.

The nearest major airport to Rabigh is the King Abdulaziz International Airport in Jeddah, 148 km (92 mi) to the south. The Haramain high-speed railway line stops at King Abdullah Economic City, providing high-speed rail connections to Jeddah, Mecca and Medina.

Culture

Natural landmarks 
The Red Sea hosts many coral reefs, and is thus the site of several marine sanctuaries, many of which are situated close to the coast. The Five Corals Reef is one such reef situated approximately 15 km (9 mi) south west of Rabigh.

Sports 
The Al Entesar Club is a football club from Rabigh playing in the Saudi Second Division.

See also 
 Makkah Province
 Petro Rabigh
 King Abdullah Economic City
 King Abdullah University of Science and Technology

References 

Populated places in Mecca Province
Geography of Saudi Arabia
Islam in Saudi Arabia
Islamic holy places
Hajj
Wadis of Saudi Arabia
Ziyarat